Yasniel Matos Rodríguez (born 29 March 2002) is a Cuban professional footballer who plays as a striker for Liga Nacional club Municipal and the Cuba football team.

International career 
Matos made his debut for the Cuba national football team on 24 March 2021. On 2 November 2021, Matos was called up for two international friendlies in Nicaragua.

Career statistics

References

External links
 
 

Living people
2002 births
Cuban footballers
Association football forwards
FC Holguín players
C.S.D. Municipal players
Liga Nacional de Fútbol de Guatemala players
People from Holguín